John's Other Wife is an American old-time radio soap opera. It was broadcast on NBC-Red from September 14, 1936, until March 1940. In that month it moved to NBC-Blue, where it ran until March 20, 1942.

Overview 
John's Other Wife centered around a store executive, his wife, and a woman who worked for him. The man in the title was John Perry, who owned Perry's Department Store. His insecure wife, Elizabeth, suspected John of being romantically involved with either Annette Rogers, his secretary, or Martha Curtis, his assistant.

The program was one of many soap operas created and produced by Frank Hummert and his wife, Anne.

Sponsors included Bi-So-Dol, Old English floor wax, Louis Phillipe lipstick and Freezone. The theme was "The Sweetest Story Ever Told", by Stanley Davis.

Beginning on May 8, 1939, John's Other Wife was broadcast via electrical transcription on WMCA in New York City in addition to its regular network airings. It was one of eight Blackett-Sample-Hummert programs to do so as a means of increasing New York City coverage for BSH clients.

Cast 
The program's cast included the actors shown in the table below:

Source: Radio Programs, 1924-1984: A Catalog of More Than 1800 Shows

References 
 

1936 radio programme debuts
1940 radio programme endings
American radio soap operas
NBC radio programs
NBC Blue Network radio programs
1930s American radio programs
1940s American radio programs